Saint-Omer was a former parish municipality in the Gaspésie–Îles-de-la-Madeleine region of Quebec, Canada.

On October 4, 2000, it merged with the city of Carleton to create the new city of Carleton–Saint-Omer, which was renamed to Carleton-sur-Mer on May 7, 2005.

It is the site of the Saint-Omer Bird Sanctuary.

References

Carleton-sur-Mer
Former municipalities in Quebec
Populated places disestablished in 2000